11-Hydroxy-Δ9-tetrahydrocannabinol (11-OH-Δ9-THC, alternatively numbered as 7-OH-Δ1-THC), usually referred to as 11-hydroxy-THC is the main active metabolite of tetrahydrocannabinol (THC), which is formed in the body after Δ9-THC is consumed.

After cannabis consumption, THC is metabolized inside the body by cytochrome P450 enzymes such as CYP2C9 and CYP3A4 into 11-hydroxy-THC and then further metabolized by the dehydrogenase and CYP2C9 enzyme to form 11-nor-9-carboxy-THC (THC-COOH) which is inactive at the CB1 receptors; and further glucuronidated to form 11-nor-delta-9-tetrahydrocannabinol-9-carboxylic acid glucuronide (delta-9-THC-COOH-glu) where it is excreted in both feces and urine. Both compounds, along with THC, can be assayed in drug tests.

11-hydroxy-THC can be formed after consumption of THC from inhalation (vaping, smoking) and oral (by mouth, edible, sublingual) use, although levels of 11-hydroxy-THC are typically higher when eaten compared to inhalation.

Pharmacology 
In an analysis by the University of Rhode Island on cannabinoids it was found that 11-OH-D9-THC had the 3rd highest 3C-like protease inhibitor activity against COVID-19 out of all the cannabinoids tested within that study but not as high as the antiviral drug GC376 (56% 11-OH-D9-THC) vs 100% GC376).

See also 
 3'-Hydroxy-THC
 7-Hydroxycannabidiol
 8,11-Dihydroxytetrahydrocannabinol
 11-OH-CBN
 Cannabis edible
 Delta-11-Tetrahydrocannabinol

References 

Cannabinoids
Benzochromenes
Primary alcohols
Phenols
Prodrugs